Hakman is a surname. Notable people with the surname include:

Berk Hakman (born 1981), Turkish actor, musician, and photographer
Ivan Hakman (born 1955), Soviet former professional football defender and coach
Jeff Hakman (born 1948), American surfer and businessman
Kosta Hakman (1899-1961), Yugoslav painter
Vasyl Hakman (born 2000), Ukrainian professional footballer

See also
Kim Hak-man (born 1976), South Korean rifle shooter
Hackman (surname)